Bù Đốp is a rural district in Bình Phước province of the Southeast region of Vietnam, approximately 90 km north of Ho Chi Minh City, near the border with Cambodia.  the district had a population of 51,597. The district covers an area of 378 km². The district capital lies at Thanh Bình.

References

Districts of Bình Phước province